Pseudohemiodon laticeps is a species of armored catfish native to Argentina, Brazil and Paraguay where it occurs in the Uruguay, Paraná and Paraguay River basins.  This species grows to a length of  SL.

References
 

Loricariini
Fish of South America
Fish of Argentina
Fish of Brazil
Fish of Paraguay
Taxa named by Charles Tate Regan
Fish described in 1904